Rhabidius is a genus of beetles in the family Carabidae, containing the following species:

 Rhabidius camerunensis Basilewsky, 1948
 Rhabidius jeanneli Basilewsky, 1948

References

Harpalinae